Saturday's Hero is a 1951 American film noir drama sports film directed by David Miller. It is also known as Idols in the Dust, and stars John Derek and Donna Reed. Saturday's Hero was the first film for Aldo Ray, who was still going by Aldo DaRe, but it was released after his second acting job in My True Story (1951). The film was also the debut score of Elmer Bernstein.

Plot
Steve Novak, a Polish-American immigrant from a small New Jersey mill town, decides to go to a college in Virginia to play football. He becomes a star player as a freshman, but hears stories of teammates receiving money for their play.

Steve falls for Melissa (Donna Reed), the daughter of one of the school's rich benefactors, TC McCabe. When he suffers injuries on the field, Steve realizes that a college education will mean more to his future than football will. He also tries to win Melissa's love, over her uncle’s strong objections.

Cast
 John Derek as Steve Novak
 Donna Reed as Melissa
 Sidney Blackmer as TC McCabe
 Alexander Knox as Professor Megroth
 Elliott Lewis as Eddie Adams
 Otto Hulett as Coach "Preacher" Tennant
 Howard St. John as Belfrage
 Aldo Ray as Gene Hausler (as Aldo DaRe)
 Alvin Baldock as Francis 'Clay' Clayborne
 Wilbur Robertson as Bob Whittier
 Charles Mercer Barnes as Moose Wagner
 Bill Martin as Joe Mestrovic
 Mickey Knox as Joey Novak
 Sandro Giglio as Poppa Jan Novak
 Tito Vuolo as Manuel

Production
Columbia bought the novel specifically as a vehicle for John Derek.

The film was known in production as The Hero.The shoot went for 80 days including 35 days of football sequences.

References

External links
 
 
 
 

1951 films
1951 drama films
American drama films
American football films
American black-and-white films
Columbia Pictures films
1950s English-language films
Films scored by Elmer Bernstein
Films based on American novels
Films directed by David Miller
Films set in universities and colleges
Films with screenplays by Sidney Buchman
1950s American films